The Lake Helen Historic District is a U.S. historic district (designated as such on September 16, 1993) located in Lake Helen, Florida. The district is bounded by West New York, Lakeview, Park and Euclid Avenues. It contains 71 historic buildings.

References

External links
 Volusia County listings at National Register of Historic Places

National Register of Historic Places in Volusia County, Florida
Historic districts on the National Register of Historic Places in Florida